is a Japanese manga artist. Takeshobo started serializing her work Kimi no Ashiato wa Bara-iro (Your Footprints are Rosy) on July 31, 2017.

Works
 Senobi shi te jounetsu (April 2009)
 Mikazuki no mitsu (October 2010)
 Kono kajitsu ha dare no mono (June 2012)
 Ichibanboshi no Soba de (December 2013)
 Yogoto no yubisaki/Mafuyu no hate (January 2014)
 Anata dake houseki (July 2015)
 Hana wa nisemono (July 2015)
 Watashi ni mienai koigokoro (September 2015)
 Kimi no Ashiato wa Bara-iro (July 2017)
 Okaasan to Yacchan (August 2017)

References

Manga artists
Living people
Year of birth missing (living people)